This is a list of coats of arms of Albania.

Medieval coats of arms
Throughout the course of history, the earliest evidence on the usage of coats of arms by local overlords in present-day Albania can be traced back to the 13th century with the Principality of Arbanon and its ruler, Demetrio Progoni.

Comparatively, other noble families of the early medieval period followed suit, most notably the Gropa, Skuraj, Jonima, Dukagjini, Arianiti and continuing with the Balsha, Thopia, Muzaka, Spata, to conclude with the Kastrioti, whose symbols are still in use today.

State coats of arms

Military coats of arms

Administrative coats of arms

Counties
The symbolism in the coats of arms of counties in Albania is reflected in Article 5 of Law no. 139/2015, later amended by Law no. 38/2019, dated 20 June 2019 and entitled "On Local Self-Governance", which classifies the county as a second level unit of local governance that represents an administrative-territorial unit, consisting of several municipalities with geographical, traditional, economic, social and common interests.

Municipalities
City emblems are supposed to include and show, in a highly stylized manner and preferably according to the formal rules of heraldry, elements and features that are characteristic and representative of the respective city.

See also
 Coat of arms of Albania
 Armorial of sovereign states

References

Albania